Sports City can refer to:

Multi-purpose stadiums